Schwarzbach is a river of Saxony, Germany.

The Schwarzbach is a left tributary of the Große Mittweida.

See also
List of rivers of Saxony

References

Rivers of Saxony
Rivers of Germany